The Supercopa de España de Balonmano Femenino is an annual Spanish women's handball tournament played by the División de Honor Femenino champions and Copa de la Reina winners. It's managed by Real Federación Española de Balonmano.

The tournament was established in 2000. It's played around early September.

Winners by year

Wins by club

See also
División de Honor
Copa de la Reina

References

External links
RFEBM Official website
Supercopa winners by year

Handball cup competitions in Spain
Recurring sporting events established in 2000
2000 establishments in Spain